Brite Semiconductor is a fabless semiconductor company founded in 2008 to develop custom ASIC designs. The company focuses on high-end design services and turnkey services below 90 nm, as well as one package services, from source codes or netlists to chips as finished products.

History
Brite Semiconductor was founded in July 2008 in Shanghai's Zhangjiang High-Tech Park; its investors include Open-Silicon, Norwest Venture Partners, Gobi Partners, InterWest Partners and Pierre Lamond. Brite acquired its first successful 130 nm tape-out three months after its founding, its first 90 nm design win in September, and first 65 nm tape-out in October with the assistance of its leading strategic business partner and lead shareholder, Open-Silicon.  In January 2009, Open-Silicon granted Brite license to its MAX technology. In April 2010, Brite and Open-Silicon announced the success of a 65 nm wireless network chip. Also in April, Synopsys Inc announced that Brite Semiconductor will join the Synopsys IP OEM Partner Program.

Products and services
Brite offers third party manufacturing services, product OEM, and design. Services also include frontend and backend physical design, test engineering, packaging and assembly, wafer fabrication, and production support.

References

Semiconductor companies of China
Fabless semiconductor companies
Companies based in Shanghai
Computer companies established in 2008
Electronics companies established in 2008